Giorgos Danas (Greek: Γιώργος Δανάς; born June 22, 1991, in Rhodes, Greece) is a Greek professional basketball player. He is a 6'0" (1.83 m) tall point guard.

Professional career
Danas started his professional career with Kolossos Rhodes in 2008. In 2014, he signed with Lavrio. In October 2015, he moved to Promitheas Patras in the Greek 2nd Division.

References

External links
Eurobasket.com Profile
Onsports.gr Profile
Draftexpress.com Profile

1991 births
Living people
EFAO Zografou B.C. players
Greek Basket League players
Greek men's basketball players
Kolossos Rodou B.C. players
Lavrio B.C. players
Point guards
Promitheas Patras B.C. players
People from Rhodes
Sportspeople from the South Aegean